Alexander Zeitlin (28 August 1900, in Russia – 19 April 1998) was a Russian-American military leader. He was prominent in the United States Air Force major hydraulic press design program following the Second World War and Korean War years. He and his colleagues worked on "The Heavy Press Program of the United States Air Force." that began in earnest in 1950.

Career

Heavy Press Program 
The Heavy (Forging) Press Program were installed at Alcoa Cleveland, Ohio and Wyman Gordon, North Grafton, Massachusetts. The two Forging Press manufacturers were Loewy Hydropress Inc. (Loewy) and Mesta Machine of Pittsburgh, Pennsylvania. At Loewy, Zeitlin was involved in the design and construction of the 35,000 ton press code-named "Minor" and the 50,000 ton code-named "Major" forging presses.

For strategic reasons, two other "Minor" and "Major" forging presses and were built by Mesta Machine and were commissioned at Alcoa Cleveland, Ohio, during the same time period. Both had a 50,000-ton forge capacity and were powered by hydraulic systems with forging flows of 12,000 Gallons per Minute (45,000 Liters/min.) at 4,500 (PSI 310 bar), Loewy Presses were a pull-down design using columnar plate design while the Mesta design used moving platens with round columns. Both the 50,000-ton presses are listed as National Historic Engineering Landmarks.

The Loewy forging press made the Boeing 747 main wing beams and all the B2b Stealth Bomber forgings at Wyman-Gordon.

Bliss Barrogenics
In the 1960s Zeitlin continued his work as Vice President of Bliss Barrogenics of Mount Vernon, New York continually focused on the heavy press industry. During that period the Soviets had built two 65,000 Metric Ton (72,000-US Ton) presses and were rumored to be building larger presses.

Press Technology Corporation
He formed Press Technology Corporation (PTC) of White Plains, New York. With his 'right-hand man', Adam Zandel (of Forest Hills, New York) the company led proposals for larger presses. In the 1980s and into the 90's PTC, Zietlin and Zandel were central in promoting and supporting the strategic U. S. need for construction for 100,000-ton and 200,000-ton "Super Presses". PTC developed complete detailed plans and proposals for all project phases. Suppliers for all major components and systems had been identified and bids were ready for Air Force approval. Several ex-Loewy senior designers and engineers including engineers who had worked on the original presses at Alcoa and Wyman Gordon were available.

As the political scene changed, aircraft frame development moved to use composites, which delayed and possibly eliminated the need for these larger presses.

Zeitlin's work included several key US government and classified military projects. Zeitlin alone and PTC worked on several other military projects and developed several patents. For example, PTC patented a press frame concept for an enormous 500,000-ton forging press and also patented press designs incorporating composite materials.

Personal life
Alexander Zeitlin was born August 28, 1900 in Russia and died April 19, 1998, in White Plains, Westchester, New York.

Sources
Linderman Library, Lehigh University, Bethlehem, Pennsylvania Call No.: SC MS 078
American Society of Tool and Manufacturing Engineers Library of Congress Catalog Card # 68-23024
US Patents Office # 4,787,654; 4,706,490; 4,694,678 & 4,566,372.
ASME (American Society of Manufacturing Engineers) Dedication Ceremony; 50,000 Ton Closed Die Forging Press, Cleveland, Ohio, 24 September 1981, publication
Business contact information and references of Charles N. Johnson of Wisconsin

1900 births
1998 deaths
United States Air Force civilians
Cold War history of the United States
People of the Cold War
Place of birth missing